François Frank Blais (born August 22, 1875June 2, 1949) was a Canadian politician, contractor, farmer, lumber merchant. He was elected to the House of Commons of Canada in the 1935 election as an Independent Liberal to represent the riding of Chapleau.

Blais was born in Saint-Paul-de-Montminy, Quebec, Canada.

External links
 

1875 births
1949 deaths
Independent Liberal MPs in Canada
Members of the House of Commons of Canada from Quebec